The 1833 Kunming earthquake was an 8.0 Mw earthquake that struck the provincial capital Kunming in Yunnan, China on September 6, 1833. The earthquake destroyed many buildings, homes, and temples in Kunming and the nearby countryside. More than 6,000 people died as a result of the earthquake and another 80,000 were displaced. The Qing government at the time provided relief to the region and used the event to strengthen its administration in the province. The 1833 Kunming earthquake was the largest magnitude earthquake in Yunnan's recorded history.

See also
List of earthquakes in Yunnan
List of earthquakes in China

References

Further reading

Earthquakes in Yunnan
1833 in Asia
1833 earthquakes
September 1833 events
Geography of Kunming
1833 in China
1833 disasters in China